Freddie Miller (April 3, 1911 – May 8, 1962) was an American boxer from Cincinnati, Ohio, who won over 200 fights and held the NBA world featherweight championship from 1933 to 1936. He was named in Ring magazine's list of the 80 Best Fighters of the Last 80 Years.

Early life and career
Miller was born on April 3, 1911, in Cincinnati, Ohio. He would become known as a quick, and clever boxer with excellent ringcraft, and his southpaw stance would give him a difficult style to defend.

In one of his earlier fights against a future contender, Miller faced Phil Zwick on November 28, 1936, beating him by a fourth-round knockout on January 26, 1931, in Wheeling, West Virginia. Zwick would contend for the world featherweight title in 1941.

Miller fought Tommy Paul three times in 1931. In the first two fights, Miller beat Paul by decision in Cincinnati. In the third, Paul beat Miller by a unanimous decision in Buffalo, New York.

NBA world featherweight title bouts against Battling Battalino
On July 23, 1931, Miller had his first title shot for the National Boxing Association (NBA) World featherweight title, against Battling Battalino. Miller would go on to lose the match by a ten-round unanimous decision in Cincinnati, Ohio.

Miller went on to face Battalino on January 27, 1932, in Cincinnati for the NBA World Featherweight Title before a small crowd of 2,000 in what was one of the most peculiar fights of his career.  The defending champion, Battalino, came in three pounds overweight and did not put up a good fight. Battalino went down in the third round from what the referee, Lou Bauman, and many in the crowd, considered a harmless right to the chin. Some in the crowd suspected a "fix". When Battalino arose, Miller put him down again. The referee stopped the fight and declared Miller the winner. The National Boxing Association and the New York State Athletic Commission, however, overruled the referee and declared the bout a "no contest." Having declared the bout a no contest, the title become vacant.  Battalino was fined $5,000, and would later be stripped of his title by the NYSAC, taking effect on March 1, 1932. To end any confusion about his championship status, Battalino voluntarily relinquished the title by March and moved up a weightclass to fight at the lightweight limit.

NBA world feather champion
On January 13, 1933, Miller fought Tommy Paul for the fourth time. Miller defeated Paul in a ten-round unanimous decision at Chicago Stadium, taking the National Boxing Association World featherweight title. In an exceptionally long reign as champion, Miller fought thirteen times in the next three years before finally losing the title to Petey Sarron on March 2, 1936. Miller successfully defended his title 12 times. He defeated Baby Arizmendi, Abie Israel in a rematch, Jackie Sharkey, Paul Dazzo, Nel Tarleton, Jose Girones, Nel Tarleton a second time, Vernon Cormier, Johnny Pena,  Gene Espinosa,  and Petey Sarron.

Defenses of the world feather title
While still holding the NBA world featherweight title, Miller met Baby Arizmendi, reigning California State World Featherweight champion on January 28, 1933.  Miller won the ten-round match by decision at Los Angeles's Olympic Auditorium, retaining the NBA world featherweight title, and gaining the California State world featherweight title.

On March 21, 1933, Miller defeated Filipino Speedy Dado, California bantamweight champion, for the NBA world featherweight title in a ten-round points decision at Olympic Stadium in Los Angeles.  Miller won seven of the ten rounds, and had Dado on the floor for a six count from a strong right to the head in the second round.  Dado took only rounds three and seven.

Defending the NBA world featherweight title on July 11, 1933, Miller defeated Abie Israel in a fourth-round knockout before 7000 fans at the Civic Ice Arena in Seattle.

In an NBA world featherweight championship on January 1, 1934, Miller defeated Jackie Sharkey at Cincinnati's Music Hall Arena in a ten-round unanimous decision.  Miller took his victory by a wide margin; he put Sharkey to the canvas for a count of seven with a right and left to the jaw in the second, and again for a count of seven using a left to the jaw in the tenth.  Sharkey appeared to win on points only in two rounds, the fourth and the seventh.

In an NBA world featherweight title, Paul Dazzo was knocked out by Miller, 1:20 into the sixth round, at the Jefferson County Armory in Louisville, Kentucky on May 4, 1934.  On the eve of the Kentucky Derby, the bout was the first world title held in the Blue Grass state since 1934.  Taking an edge from the start, Dazzo was credited with the second, third, fourth, and fifth, with Dazzo holding even in the first.

Boxing in Europe
Miller went on a boxing tour of England, Wales, Scotland, Spain, France, Belgium, and Ireland, boxing in all but Scotland and Wales, including the capitals of Brussels, Belgium and Dublin, Ireland.  He fought Josep Gironès twice in Barcelona, Spain on December 1, 1934, and on February 17, 1935, taking the first by a disqualification.  In  their second meeting, an NBA world featherweight title fight, he knocked out Josep in the first of fifteen rounds.

Miller fought the legendary reigning world bantamweight champion Panama Al Brown on December 24, 1934, in Paris, winning in a non-title ten round points decision.

In Liverpool, England, on June 12, 1935, Miller defeated Ned Tarleton, European and British featherweight champion, for the NBA world featherweight title in a fifteen-round points decision.  In an easy victory, Miller floored Tarleton for a count of six in the first round, and in the official scoring won all but two rounds.

On July 12, 1935, the Cincinnati featherweight champ defeated Stan Jehu in Dublin, Ireland in a fourth-round decision.

Return to America
In his first NBA world featherweight title defense since returning from Europe, Miller met Vernon Cormier at Boston Garden on October 22, 1935, before a modest depression crowd of 4,300.  Cormier was credited with all but the tenth and thirteenth rounds which were taken by Cormier.  There were no knockdowns in the fight, nor was either boxer staggered, and each  studied technique in the long match.

In an NBA world featherweight championship on February 18, 1936, in Seattle, Miller defeated Johnny Pena in a twelfth round unanimous decision.  In a decisive victory, ringside reporters credited Miller with every round in the match.  He landed the only knockdown of the bout, sending Pena to the canvas for a count of nine in the eleventh.    Pena had taken a previous decision over Miller in Oakland.

In one of his last defenses of the NBA world featherweight title, Miller defeated Petey Sarron, future featherweight champion, in a fifteen-round points decision in Coral Cables, Florida, on March 2, 1936.  In a controversial decision, two of the six rounds given to Miller were due to Sarron fouls, which included calls for low blows in the ninth, eleventh, and twelfth rounds.  In a close bout, the referee gave three rounds to Sarron, six to Miller, and called three even.  If not for the low blow calls, Sarron would have taken five rounds.

NBA world feather title loss, May, 1936
On May 11, 1936, he finally lost to Sarron for the NBA world featherweight title in a fifteen-round mixed decision at Griffith Stadium in Washington D.C.  One judge ruled the bout a draw, but the other judge and referee ruled for Miller.  It was Sarron's twelfth title fight since taking the title in January 1933 from Tommy Paul.

Late career fights
In his fifth bout with Tommy Paul, Miller lost by disqualification at Los Angeles's Olympic Auditorium on June 19, 1934.  A low blow in the second of ten rounds dislocated Paul's hip. In the sixth and last fight between them on August 3, 1934, Miller won by a ten-round points decision at Los Angeles's Legion Stadium.

Miller knocked out Phil Zwick in a match in Johannesburg, South Africa on November 28, 1936. Miller cut Zwick on the head with an accidental head butt.

He had a final rematch with Petey Sarron in a twelve-round points decision on September 4, 1937, for the National Boxing Association World featherweight title in Johannesburg, South Africa. In a slashing fight, Miller was dropped twice by Sarron, in what the Associated Press deemed "a decisive victory".

The aging ex-featherweight champion had one last title shot of his career against Leo Rodak for the Maryland State Version of the World Featherweight Title, but lost the fight by decision on October 24, 1938.  The first six rounds were slow, but in the closing rounds, Rodak hammered Miller with rights and lefts to the face and body.

In his last big fight of his career Miller lost to Sammy Angott.

Records
Miller fought Tommy Paul six times, the most of any boxer he faced. Miller's record against Tommy was 4-2-0.

Life after boxing
Miller was married in 1931 to his wife, the former Louise Somhorst.

From 1954 to 1962 Miller worked for a field engineering crew at Hamilton County Courthouse near Cincinnati.  He was one of the few boxers of the depression era who was believed to have invested his boxing earnings wisely.   He died at only 51 in the early morning of May 8, 1962, of a heart attack at Cincinnati's Good Samaritan Hospital, after having been observed for several weeks for heart problems. He left his wife of 31 years, Louise, a daughter, and two grandchildren.

He was inducted into the International Boxing Hall of Fame in 1997.

Professional boxing record
All information in this section is derived from BoxRec, unless otherwise stated.

Official record

All newspaper decisions are officially regarded as "no decision" bouts and are not counted in the win/loss/draw column.

Unofficial record

Record with the inclusion of newspaper decisions in the win/loss/draw column.

See also
List of left-handed boxers

References

External links
 

|-

  

1911 births
1962 deaths
Featherweight boxers
World boxing champions
World featherweight boxing champions
Boxers from Cincinnati
American male boxers